USS Grand Island (PF-14), a , was the only ship of the United States Navy to be named for Grand Island, Nebraska.

Construction
Grand Island, a patrol frigate, was originally classified as PG-122 and launched by the Kaiser Cargo, Inc., shipyard in Richmond, California, on 19 February 1944, as PF-14, sponsored by Mrs. William Shackleton; and commissioned on 27 May 1944.

Service history
After completing her shakedown cruise off the coast of southern California, Grand Island reported for duty with the 12th Naval District on 12 September 1944.  She subsequently performed weather station and plane guard duty out of San Francisco, California, and participated in several training exercises with patrol forces on the West Coast.  She also was engaged from time to time in antisubmarine escort duty. Grand Island departed San Francisco on 26 March 1946, arrived at Charleston, South Carolina, on 13 April 1946 via the Panama Canal Zone, and was turned over to the 6th Naval District for disposal.  She was decommissioned on 21 May 1946 and was stricken from the Navy Register on 19 June.

Declared not essential to the defense of the United States, the frigate was turned over to the State Department Foreign Liquidation Corporation and finally transferred to Cuba on 16 June 1947, where she served as Maximo Gomez.

References

External links 
 
hazegray.org: USS Grand Island

Tacoma-class frigates
Ships built in Richmond, California
1944 ships
World War II frigates and destroyer escorts of the United States
Tacoma-class frigates of the Cuban Navy